Tic-Tac-Terror is the 74th title of the Hardy Boys Mystery Stories, written by Franklin W. Dixon.  It was published by Wanderer Books in 1982.

Plot
In this book the Frank and Joe Hardy are asked to investigate a mystery involving a world-famous spy from HAVOC, an international network of terrorists, who wants to defect to the U.S.  Frank and Joe know the spy as "Igor”.

Also a million-dollar emerald from South America has vanished. Joe and Frank think “Igor” was involved. Their only clue is mysterious symbol in shape of tic-tac-toe. The game lead to a building that is run by the U.S. government. The building has a bomb and the Hardys are trapped in a deadly game of tic-tac-toe.

References

The Hardy Boys books
1982 American novels
1982 children's books
Novels about terrorism